Alison Whittaker is a Gomeroi writer and a senior researcher at the University of Technology Sydney, Australia.  A review in World Literature Today called her "Australia's most important recently emerged poet".

Early life and education
Whittaker's mother is Gomeroi and her father was not an indigenous Australian. She grew up on the floodplains of Gunnedah near the Namoi River in New South Wales.  She has a BA in writing and cultural studies and an LLB (2016), both from the University of Technology Sydney, and an LLM from Harvard University (2017) where she was a Fulbright Scholar and was named the Dean's Scholar in Race, Gender and Criminal Law.

Work
Whittaker's 2016 debut poetry collection Lemons in the Chicken Wire, which she has described as "a call to the humanity of Indigenous queer and trans mob".  For it she was awarded a black&write! fellowship from the State Library of Queensland, where it was described as a "highly original collection of poems bristling with stunning imagery and gritty textures".

Her second poetry collection, BlakWork (2018), won the 2019 Judith Wright Calanthe Award. It has been described as a "discursively monumental collection [which] asserts unwavering pressure on the idea of 'Australia'", in "a voice seething with impatience, grief-stricken at the fate of this occupied place". The reviewer for the Sydney Review of Books said it was "a unique hybrid of poetry, memoir, reportage, legal documentation, fiction, non-fiction, satire, and social commentary" and "Written from a Gomeroi, queer perspective, BlakWork challenges the legacies of stolen land, systematic cultural genocide, forced removal of children, deaths in custody, persistent stereotypes about Aboriginal people and rural communities, and the ongoing 'divide and rule' trope of 'discovery narratives' by white Australia that contain Aboriginal peoples, our experiences, culture, her/histories and communities." Whittaker was shortlisted for the Victorian Premier's Literary Award for Indigenous Writing for Blakwork.

Whittaker edited the 2020 collection Fire Front: First Nations Poetry and Power and presented a session of readings from it at the online 2020 Edinburgh International Book Festival. A review in ArtsHub Australia said that it gave "insights from some of the most original and talented First Nations writers and thinkers in our country". Writing in The Canberra Times, Geoff Page said that with one possible exception it was "the most ambitious attempt to update and/or replace" Kevin Gilbert's 1988 Penguin Inside Black Australia: an anthology of Aboriginal poetry, and that "The 53 poems in Fire Front do much to illustrate the variety of contemporary Aboriginal poetry in English".

Her academic research interests include: indigenous peoples and the law; critical legal and critical race studies; and death in custody. She has published a number of articles, chapters, and conference contributions. She has written several pieces for The Guardian.

Selected publications
  

Whittaker, Alison (2018). 'Aboriginemo', Growing Up Aboriginal In Australia. Black Inc. ISBN 9781863959810

References

Further reading

External links

Year of birth missing (living people)
Living people
University of Technology Sydney alumni
Harvard Law School alumni
Indigenous Australian writers
Australian women poets
21st-century Australian poets
Indigenous Australian academics
Indigenous Australian women academics
Gamilaraay